Simone Napoli (born 10 July 1994 in Italy) is an Italian footballer.

References

Italian footballers
Association football defenders
Living people
1994 births
CSM Ceahlăul Piatra Neamț players
ND Gorica players